Shirley Purdie (born 1947) is a contemporary Indigenous Australian artist, notable for winning the 2007 Blake Prize for Religious Art.  She is a painter at Warmun Community, in Western Australia's Kimberley region.

Life
Purdie was born in 1947 at Gilbun, or Mabel Downs Station, in Western Australia's Kimberley region, daughter of Madigan Thomas. She moved to Warmun, not far from her birthplace, where she lives and paints. She is married to artist Gordon Barney. 

Her Ngarrangarni (totem is a crow, and skin is Nangari.

Art
Purdie was taught by her mother and by major Kimberley Indigenous artist Queenie McKenzie, two women who were among the first to paint at Warmun in the early 1980s.
Her work Stations of the Cross was washed off the walls of the[ Warmun Art Centre]] in the catastrophic floods of March 2007, and when later recovered from beside the creek it was found to have been seriously damaged. The work portrays the Christian iconography of the 14 Stations of the Cross, but also the history of conflict and racial violence in the artist's community in the 1920s and 1930s.

Awards

Purdie has won several awards, including the Blake Prize for Religious Art in 2007, for her work Stations of the Cross.

Collections

Purdie's works are held by major galleries, including the Museum of Contemporary Art Australia, National Gallery of Australia, which has her 1996 lithograph, Giwiwan – Bow River Country. This print shows the influence of the painting style of major artist Rover Thomas.

Books 

 Shirley Purdie: My Story, Ngaginybe Jarragbe, Magabala, 2020  – shortlisted for the Premier's Prize for an Emerging Writer at the 2020 Western Australian Premier's Book Awards and for the 2021 Children's Book of the Year Award for New Illustrator.

References

1947 births
Living people
Australian Aboriginal artists
People from Warmun Community
Artists from Western Australia
Blake Prize for Religious Art winners